In enzymology, a dephospho-[reductase kinase] kinase is an enzyme that catalyzes the chemical reaction

ATP + dephospho-{[hydroxymethylglutaryl-CoA reductase (NADPH)] kinase}  ADP + {[hydroxymethylglutaryl-CoA reductase (NADPH)] kinase}

Thus, the two substrates of this enzyme are ATP and [[dephospho-{[hydroxymethylglutaryl-CoA reductase (NADPH)] kinase}]], whereas its two products are ADP and [[{[hydroxymethylglutaryl-CoA reductase (NADPH)] kinase}]].

This enzyme belongs to the family of transferases, specifically those transferring a phosphate group to the sidechain oxygen atom of serine or threonine residues in proteins (protein-serine/threonine kinases). The systematic name of this enzyme class is ATP:dephospho-{[hydroxymethylglutaryl-CoA reductase (NADPH)] kinase} phosphotransferase. Other names in common use include AMP-activated kinase, AMP-activated protein kinase kinase, hydroxymethylglutaryl coenzyme A reductase kinase kinase, hydroxymethylglutaryl coenzyme A reductase kinase kinase, (phosphorylating), reductase kinase, reductase kinase kinase, and STK30.

References

 
 
 
 
 

EC 2.7.11
Enzymes of unknown structure